An Adventure on the Mexican Border is a 1913 American short silent Western film directed by, written by and starring Romaine Fielding with co-stars Mary Ryan and Robyn Adair. It was filmed at Nogales, Arizona.

Plot 
The film depicts the actions of U.S. troops stationed on the boundary dividing the United States from Mexico "with a view to protecting the International line and the citizens of the United States." On the other side of the border, Mexican soldiers "were camped to do likewise for their country."  In this highly charged climate "one of the bright-eyed senoritas from the southern race" has captivated an officer from each side.  The Mexican captain, played by Fielding, wins her hand via "quiet love and kindness," while "the irrepressible, impassionate United States trooper tries to take her heart by storm."  By bringing the U.S. regiment into conflict with the Mexican troops, the rivalry "nearly causes international complications."

Cast
 Romaine Fielding – The Mexican Captain
 Mary Ryan – The Mexican Senorita
 Robyn Adair – The U.S. Cavalry Lieutenant
 Richard Wangermann – The Senorita's Father
 Eleanor Mason – The Senorita's Friend
 Maurice Cytron – The U.S. Cavalry Private (* Mauritz Cytron)
 Henry Aldrich – The Mexican Lieutenant

Themes 
The film is one of several in which Romaine Fielding portrays a Mexican character.  In this instance, the protagonists display Mexican men in a positive light, as honest and brave.  This stands in contrast to other films in which Fielding portrayed Mexican characters in a negative light (Pedro's Treachery and The Man from the West).

Critical reception 
Moving Picture World complimented the film's "convincingly military" atmosphere, which features "a troop, or two of the United States cavalry."  The reviewer equally praised Fielding for not making "a gingerbread hero of an American lieutenant and an impossible victim of a Mexican."

References

External links
 

1913 films
1913 Western (genre) films
1913 short films
American silent short films
American black-and-white films
Lubin Manufacturing Company films
Silent American Western (genre) films
Films directed by Romaine Fielding
1910s American films
1910s English-language films